The Seattle Mariners 2005 season was their 29th since the franchise creation, and their second consecutive season finishing at the bottom of the American League West, finishing with a record of 69-93 (.426). They only had one player represented at the 2005 All-Star Game, who was Ichiro Suzuki with his fifth selection for the All-Star Game.

Over the course of the disappointing season, the Mariners managed to have their longest winning streak over the course of a four-game series with the Angels (July 7–10), while having two losing streaks of seven between April 30–8 May / June 25 – July 2.

Offseason
December 17, 2004: Adrián Beltré was signed as a free agent with the Seattle Mariners.

Regular season

Opening Day starters
Adrián Beltré
Bret Boone
Raúl Ibañez
Jamie Moyer
Miguel Olivo
Jeremy Reed
Richie Sexson
Ichiro Suzuki
Wilson Valdez
Randy Winn

Season standings

Record vs. opponents

Transactions
June 7, 2005: Jeff Clement was drafted by the Seattle Mariners in the 1st round (3rd pick) of the 2005 amateur draft. Player signed July 26, 2005.
July 11, 2005: Bret Boone was sent to the Minnesota Twins by the Seattle Mariners as part of a conditional deal.
July 30, 2005: Yorvit Torrealba was traded by the San Francisco Giants with Jesse Foppert to the Seattle Mariners for Randy Winn.
August 19, 2005: Scott Spiezio was released by the Seattle Mariners.

Roster

Game log

|- style="text-align:center;background-color:#bbffbb"
| 1 || April 4 || Twins || 5–1 || Moyer (1–0) || Radke (0–1) || || 46,249 || 1–0
|- style="text-align:center;background-color:#ffbbbb"
| 2 || April 5 || Twins || 8–4 || Santana (1–0) || Thornton (0–1) || || 28,373 || 1–1
|- style="text-align:center;background-color:#ffbbbb"
| 3 || April 6 || Twins || 4–1 || Silva (1–0) || Madritsch (0–1) || Nathan (1) || 25,580 || 1–2
|- style="text-align:center;background-color:#bbffbb"
| 4 || April 8 || Rangers || 9–6 || Putz (1–0) || Regilio (0–1) || Guardado (1) || 29,652 || 2–2
|- style="text-align:center;background-color:#ffbbbb"
| 5 || April 9 || Rangers || 7–6 || Brocail (1–0) || Guardado (0–1) || Cordero (1) || 31,501 || 2–3
|- style="text-align:center;background-color:#ffbbbb"
| 6 || April 10 || Rangers || 7–6 || Riley (1–0) || Thornton (0–2) || Cordero (2) || 30,434 || 2–4
|- style="text-align:center;background-color:#bbffbb"
| 7 || April 11 || @ Royals || 8–2 || Franklin (1–0) || Hernández (1–1) || || 41,788 || 3–4
|- style="text-align:center;background-color:#bbffbb"
| 8 || April 13 || @ Royals || 2–1 || Sele (1–0) || Cerda (0–1) || Guardado (2) || 10,577 || 4–4
|- style="text-align:center;background-color:#bbffbb"
| 9 || April 14 || @ Royals || 10–2 || Moyer (2–0) || Bautista (1–1) || || 10,212 || 5–4
|- style="text-align:center;background-color:#ffbbbb"
| 10 || April 15 || @ White Sox || 6–4 || Garland (2–0) || Piñeiro (0–1) || Hermanson (2) || 16,749 || 5–5
|- style="text-align:center;background-color:#ffbbbb"
| 11 || April 16 || @ White Sox || 2–1 || Buehrle (2–1) || Franklin (1–1) || || 25,931 || 5–6
|- style="text-align:center;background-color:#bbffbb"
| 12 || April 17 || @ White Sox || 5–4 || Meche (1–0) || García (1–1) || Guardado (3) || 23,324 || 6–6
|- style="text-align:center;background-color:#ffbbbb"
| 13 || April 18 || @ Angels || 6–1 || Byrd (1–2) || Sele (1–1) || || 39,638 || 6–7
|- style="text-align:center;background-color:#bbffbb"
| 14 || April 19 || @ Angels || 5–3 || Moyer (3–0) || Gregg (1–1) || Guardado (4) || 38,667 || 7–7
|- style="text-align:center;background-color:#bbffbb"
| 15 || April 20 || Athletics || 7–6 || Piñeiro (1–1) || Street (1–1) || Guardado (5) || 24,841 || 8–7
|- style="text-align:center;background-color:#ffbbbb"
| 16 || April 21 || Athletics || 3–0 || Harden (2–0) || Franklin (1–2) || Dotel (3) || 22,428 || 8–8
|- style="text-align:center;background-color:#ffbbbb"
| 17 || April 22 || Indians || 6–1 || Sabathia (1–0) || Meche (1–1) || || 43,207 || 8–9
|- style="text-align:center;background-color:#ffbbbb"
| 18 || April 23 || Indians || 5–2 || Lee (2–0) || Sele (1–2) || Wickman (5) || 33,564 || 8–10
|- style="text-align:center;background-color:#bbffbb"
| 19 || April 24 || Indians || 9–1 || Moyer (4–0) || Elarton (0–1) || || 32,889 || 9–10
|- style="text-align:center;background-color:#bbffbb"
| 20 || April 26 || @ Rangers || 7–4 || Piñeiro (2–1) || Drese (2–2) || Guardado (6) || 23,064 || 10–10
|- style="text-align:center;background-color:#ffbbbb"
| 21 || April 27 || @ Rangers || 8–2 || Rogers (1–2) || Franklin (1–3) || || 26,308 || 10–11
|- style="text-align:center;background-color:#bbffbb"
| 22 || April 28 || @ Rangers || 4–1 || Meche (2–1) || Young (2–2) || Guardado (7) || 23,928 || 11–11
|- style="text-align:center;background-color:#bbffbb"
| 23 || April 29 || @ Athletics || 4–2 || Sele (2–2) || Haren (1–3) || Guardado (8) || 18,545 || 12–11
|- style="text-align:center;background-color:#ffbbbb"
| 24 || April 30 || @ Athletics || 6–5 || Yabu (2–0) || Villone (0–1) || || 23,288 || 12–12

|- style="text-align:center;background-color:#ffbbbb"
| 25 || May 1 ||@ Athletics || 3–2 || Zito (1–4) || Piñeiro (2–2) || Dotel (6) || 30,634 || 12–13
|- style="text-align:center;background-color:#ffbbbb"
| 26 || May 2 || Anaheim || 5–0 || Washburn (2–0) || Franklin (1–4) || || 24,184 || 12–14
|- style="text-align:center;background-color:#ffbbbb"
| 27 || May 3 || Anaheim || 5–2 || Lackey (3–1) || Meche (2–2) || Shields (2) || 29,917 || 12–15
|- style="text-align:center;background-color:#ffbbbb"
| 28 || May 4 || Anaheim || 5–2 || Byrd (2–3) || Sele (2–3) || Rodríguez (7) || 26,303 || 12–16
|- style="text-align:center;background-color:#ffbbbb"
| 29 || May 6 || @ Red Sox || 7–2 || Clement (4–0) || Moyer (4–1) || || 35,229 || 12–17
|- style="text-align:center;background-color:#bbbbbb"
| – || May 7 || @ Red Sox || colspan=5|Postponed, rescheduled for 8 May || 12–17
|- style="text-align:center;background-color:#ffbbbb"
| 30 || May 8 || @ Red Sox || 6–3 || González (1–0) || Piñeiro (2–3) || Foulke (8) || 34,848 || 12–18
|- style="text-align:center;background-color:#bbffbb"
| 31 || May 8 || @ Red Sox || 6–4 || Franklin (2–4) || Halama (1–1) || Guardado (9) || 34,671 || 13–18
|- style="text-align:center;background-color:#ffbbbb"
| 32 || May 9 || @ Yankees || 4–3 || Johnson (3–2) || Nelson (0–1) || Rivera (4) || 38,079 || 13–19
|- style="text-align:center;background-color:#ffbbbb"
| 33 || May 10 || @ Yankees || 7–4 || Wang (1–1) || Sele (2–4) || Rivera (5) || 39,780 || 13–20
|- style="text-align:center;background-color:#ffbbbb"
| 34 || May 11 || @ Yankees || 13–9 || Quantrill (1–0) || Thornton (0–3) || || 47,844 || 13–21
|- style="text-align:center;background-color:#bbffbb"
| 35 || May 13 || Red Sox || 14–7 || Mateo (1–0) || González (1–1) || || 44,534 || 14–21
|- style="text-align:center;background-color:#ffbbbb"
| 36 || May 14 || Red Sox || 6–3 || Myers (1–0) || Villone (0–2) || Foulke (9) || 46,229 || 14–22
|- style="text-align:center;background-color:#bbffbb"
| 37 || May 15 || Red Sox || 5–4 || Meche (3–2) || Wakefield (4–2) || Guardado (10) || 46,145 || 15–22
|- style="text-align:center;background-color:#ffbbbb"
| 38 || May 16 || Yankees || 6–3 || Wang (2–1) || Hasegawa (0–1) || Rivera (7) || 37,814 || 15–23
|- style="text-align:center;background-color:#ffbbbb"
| 39 || May 17 || Yankees || 6–0 || Pavano (3–2) || Mateo (1–1) || || 35,549 || 15–24
|- style="text-align:center;background-color:#bbffbb"
| 40 || May 18 || Yankees || 7–6 || Nelson (1–1) || Gordon (0–3) || Villone (1) || 37,419 || 16–24
|- style="text-align:center;background-color:#ffbbbb"
| 41 || May 20 || Padres || 6–1 || Peavy (4–0) || Franklin (2–5) || || 38,400 || 16–25
|- style="text-align:center;background-color:#bbffbb"
| 42 || May 21 || Padres || 5–3 || Meche (4–2) || Lawrence (2–5) || Guardado (11) || 37,286 || 17–25
|- style="text-align:center;background-color:#bbffbb"
| 43 || May 22 || Padres || 5–0 || Sele (3–4) || Stauffer (1–1) || || 41,017 || 18–25
|- style="text-align:center;background-color:#ffbbbb"
| 44 || May 24 || @ Orioles || 3–2 || Williams (4–3) || Putz (1–1) || Ryan (13) || 19,839 || 18–26
|- style="text-align:center;background-color:#ffbbbb"
| 45 || May 25 || @ Orioles || 3–1 || López (3–2) || Moyer (4–2) || Ryan (14) || 18,820 || 18–27
|- style="text-align:center;background-color:#ffbbbb"
| 46 || May 26 || @ Orioles || 5–2 || Cabrera (4–3) || Franklin (2–6) || || 22,166 || 18–28
|- style="text-align:center;background-color:#ffbbbb"
| 47 || May 27 || @ Devil Rays || 5–4 || Hendrickson (2–2) || Meche (4–3) || Báez (7) || 10,130 || 18–29
|- style="text-align:center;background-color:#bbffbb"
| 48 || May 28 || @ Devil Rays || 3–2 || Sele (4–4) || Fossum (2–3) || Guardado (12) || 13,281 || 19–29
|- style="text-align:center;background-color:#bbffbb"
| 49 || May 29 || @ Devil Rays || 10–9 || Villone (1–2) || McClung (0–2) || Guardado (13) || 13,851 || 20–29
|- style="text-align:center;background-color:#bbffbb"
| 50 || May 30 || Blue Jays || 4–3 || Moyer (5–2) || Lilly (3–5) || Guardado (14) || 25,540 || 21–29
|- style="text-align:center;background-color:#ffbbbb"
| 51 || May 31 || Blue Jays || 9–7 || Gaudin (1–0) || Franklin (2–7) || Batista (9) || 25,737 || 21–30

|- style="text-align:center;background-color:#bbffbb"
| 52 || June 1 || Blue Jays || 3–0 || Meche (5–3) || Chacín (5–4) || Guardado (15) || 24,815 || 22–30
|- style="text-align:center;background-color:#ffbbbb"
| 53 || June 3 || Devil Rays || 6–1 || Waechter (2–3) || Sele (4–5) || || 35,344 || 22–31
|- style="text-align:center;background-color:#bbffbb"
| 54 || June 4 || Devil Rays || 6–5 || Mateo (2–1) || Báez (4–1) || Guardado (16) || 32,742 || 23–31
|- style="text-align:center;background-color:#bbffbb"
| 55 || June 5 || Devil Rays || 6–5 || Villone (2–2) || Orvella (0–1) || || 40,004 || 24–31
|- style="text-align:center;background-color:#bbffbb"
| 56 || June 7 || @ Marlins || 4–3 || Hasegawa (1–1) || Mecir (1–1) || Guardado (17) || 20,519 || 25–31
|- style="text-align:center;background-color:#ffbbbb"
| 57 || June 8 || @ Marlins || 5–4 || Willis (10–2) || Meche (5–4) || Jones (10) || 19,313 || 25–31
|- style="text-align:center;background-color:#bbffbb"
| 58 || June 9 || @ Marlins || 8–0 || Sele (5–5) || Beckett (7–4) || || 16,069 || 26–32
|- style="text-align:center;background-color:#ffbbbb"
| 59 || June 10 || @ Nationals || 9–3 || Ayala (6–3) || Hasegawa (1–2) || || 28,704 || 26–33
|- style="text-align:center;background-color:#ffbbbb"
| 60 || June 11 || @ Nationals || 2–1 || Patterson (3–1) || Putz (1–2) || Cordero (18) || 39,108 || 26–34
|- style="text-align:center;background-color:#ffbbbb"
| 61 || June 12 || @ Nationals || 3–2 || Armas (3–3) || Franklin (2–8) || Cordero (19) || 37,170 || 26–35
|- style="text-align:center;background-color:#bbffbb"
| 62 || June 14 || Phillies || 3–1 || Meche (6–4) || Lieber (8–5) || Guardado (18) || 26,818 || 27–35
|- style="text-align:center;background-color:#bbffbb"
| 63 || June 15 || Phillies || 5–1 || Sele (6–5) || Padilla (3–6) || || 26,019 || 28–35
|- style="text-align:center;background-color:#ffbbbb"
| 64 || June 16 || Phillies || 3–2 || Geary (1–0) || Mateo (2–2) || Wagner (18) || 27,162 || 28–36
|- style="text-align:center;background-color:#bbffbb"
| 65 || June 17 || Mets || 5–0 || Moyer (6–2) || Ishii (1–6) || Nelson (1) || 37,443 || 29–36
|- style="text-align:center;background-color:#bbffbb"
| 66 || June 18 || Mets || 4–1 || Franklin (3–8) || Martínez (7–2) || Guardado (19) || 45,841 || 30–36
|- style="text-align:center;background-color:#bbffbb"
| 67 || June 19 || Mets || 11–5 || Meche (7–4) || Glavine (4–7) || || 45,785 || 31–36
|- style="text-align:center;background-color:#ffbbbb"
| 68 || June 20 || Athletics || 6–2 || Haren (5–7) || Villone (2–3) || || 27,263 || 31–37
|- style="text-align:center;background-color:#ffbbbb"
| 69 || June 21 || Athletics || 4–2 || Harden (3–3) || Piñeiro (2–4) || Duchscherer (3) || 31,673 || 31–38
|- style="text-align:center;background-color:#bbffbb"
| 70 || June 22 || Athletics || 5–4 || Guardado (1–1) || Glynn (0–4) || || 28,829 || 32–38
|- style="text-align:center;background-color:#ffbbbb"
| 71 || June 23 || Athletics || 5–0 || Saarloos (4–4) || Franklin (3–9) || || 37,549 || 32–39
|- style="text-align:center;background-color:#bbffbb"
| 72 || June 24 || @ Padres || 14–5 || Meche (8–4) || May (1–2) || || 35,942 || 33–39
|- style="text-align:center;background-color:#ffbbbb"
| 73 || June 25 || @ Padres || 8–5 || Peavy (7–2) || Sele (6–6) || Hoffman (20) || 33,926 || 33–40
|- style="text-align:center;background-color:#ffbbbb"
| 74 || June 26 || @ Padres || 5–4 || Seánez (4–0) || Mateo (2–3) || Hoffman (21) || 39,098 || 33–41
|- style="text-align:center;background-color:#ffbbbb"
| 75 || June 28 || @ Athletics || 8–1 || Zito (4–8) || Moyer (6–3) || || 14,384 || 33–42
|- style="text-align:center;background-color:#ffbbbb"
| 76 || June 29 || @ Athletics || 6–2 || Blanton (5–6) || Franklin (3–10) || || 25,177 || 33–43
|- style="text-align:center;background-color:#ffbbbb"
| 77 || June 30 || @ Athletics || 6–2 || Haren (7–7) || Meche (8–5) || || 19,583 || 33–44

|- style="text-align:center;background-color:#ffbbbb"
| 78 || July 1 || Rangers || 6–2 || Park (8–2) || Sele (6–7) || || 37,270 || 33–45
|- style="text-align:center;background-color:#ffbbbb"
| 79 || July 2 || Rangers || 6–5 || Loe (2–1) || Putz (1–3) || Cordero (19) || 34,209 || 33–46
|- style="text-align:center;background-color:#bbffbb"
| 80 || July 3 || Rangers || 2–1 || Moyer (7–3) || Rogers (9–4) || Guardado (20) || 34,397 || 34–46
|- style="text-align:center;background-color:#bbffbb"
| 81 || July 4 || @ Royals || 6–0 || Franklin (4–10) || Howell (1–3) || || 23,562 || 35–46
|- style="text-align:center;background-color:#ffbbbb"
| 82 || July 5 || @ Royals || 8–6 || Carrasco (4–3) || Meche (8–6) || MacDougal (10) || 10,658 || 35–47
|- style="text-align:center;background-color:#ffbbbb"
| 83 || July 6 || @ Royals || 5–1 || Hernández (6–9) || Sele (6–8) || MacDougal (11) || 12,206 || 35–48
|- style="text-align:center;background-color:#bbffbb"
| 84 || July 7 || @ Angels || 10–2 || Piñeiro (3–4) || Colon (11–5) || || 43,747 || 36–48
|- style="text-align:center;background-color:#bbffbb"
| 85 || July 8 || @ Angels || 10–4 || Moyer (8–3) || Washburn (5–4) || || 43,853 || 37–48
|- style="text-align:center;background-color:#bbffbb"
| 86 || July 9 || @ Angels || 6–3 || Franklin (5–10) || Lackey (6–4) || || 44,012 || 38–48
|- style="text-align:center;background-color:#bbffbb"
| 87 || July 10 || @ Angels || 7–4 || Meche (9–6) || Santana (3–4) || Guardado (21) || 41,657 || 39–48
|- style="text-align:center;background-color:#ffbbbb"
| 88 || July 14 || Orioles || 5–3 || Cabrera (8–7) || Sele (6–9) || Ryan (20) || 36,316 || 39–49
|- style="text-align:center;background-color:#ffbbbb"
| 89 || July 15 || Orioles || 6–3 || López (9–5) || Piñeiro (3–5) || Ryan (21) || 39,044 || 39–50
|- style="text-align:center;background-color:#bbffbb"
| 90 || July 16 || Orioles || 3–2 || Putz (2–3) || Ray (0–1) || || 39,282 || 40–50
|- style="text-align:center;background-color:#bbffbb"
| 91 || July 17 || Orioles || 8–2 || Meche (10–6) || Ponson (7–8) || || 41,215 || 41–50
|- style="text-align:center;background-color:#ffbbbb"
| 92 || July 19 || @ Blue Jays || 12–10 || Lilly (8–9) || Sele (6–10) || Batista (16) || 20,516 || 41–51
|- style="text-align:center;background-color:#ffbbbb"
| 93 || July 20 || @ Blue Jays || 9–4 || Chacín (9–5) || Franklin (5–11) || || 28,801 || 41–52
|- style="text-align:center;background-color:#ffbbbb"
| 94 || July 21 || @ Blue Jays || 6–3 || Towers (7–8) || Piñeiro (3–6) || Batista (17) || 26,837 || 41–53
|- style="text-align:center;background-color:#bbffbb"
| 95 || July 22 || @ Indians || 4–3 || Putz (3–3) || Elarton (6–5) || Guardado (22) || 27,208 || 42–53
|- style="text-align:center;background-color:#ffbbbb"
| 96 || July 23 || @ Indians || 4–3 || Lee (11–4) || Meche (10–7) || Wickman (24) || 28,498 || 42–54
|- style="text-align:center;background-color:#ffbbbb"
| 97 || July 24 || @ Indians || 6–3 || Millwood (4–9) || Sele (6–11) || || 22,863 || 42–55
|- style="text-align:center;background-color:#bbffbb"
| 98 || July 25 || Tigers || 5–3 || Putz (4–3) || Robertson (5–8) || Guardado (23) || 27,102 || 43–55
|- style="text-align:center;background-color:#ffbbbb"
| 99 || July 26 || Tigers || 8–5 || Johnson (7–8) || Mateo (2–4) || Farnsworth (6) || 30,644 || 43–56
|- style="text-align:center;background-color:#bbffbb"
| 100 || July 27 || Tigers || 9–3 || Moyer (9–3) || Maroth (8–11) || || 29,323 || 44–56
|- style="text-align:center;background-color:#ffbbbb"
| 101 || July 28 || Indians || 6–5 || Howry (6–2) || Putz (4–4) || Wickman (26) || 28,500 || 44–57
|- style="text-align:center;background-color:#ffbbbb"
| 102 || July 29 || Indians || 10–5 || Millwood (5–9) || Sele (6–12) || || 32,966 || 44–58
|- style="text-align:center;background-color:#bbffbb"
| 103 || July 30 || Indians || 3–2 || Franklin (6–11) || Sabathia (6–9) || Guardado (24) || 37,719 || 45–58
|- style="text-align:center;background-color:#ffbbbb"
| 104 || July 31 || Indians || 9–7 || Westbrook (9–12) || Piñeiro (3–7) || Wickman (27) || 33,652 || 45–59

|- style="text-align:center;background-color:#bbffbb"
| 105 || August 2 || @ Tigers || 4–1 || Mateo (3–4) || Johnson (7–9) || Guardado (25) || 30,306 || 46–59
|- style="text-align:center;background-color:#ffbbbb"
| 106 || August 3 || @ Tigers || 10–7 || Maroth (9–11) || Meche (10–8) || Rodney (1) || 26,760 || 46–60
|- style="text-align:center;background-color:#ffbbbb"
| 107 || August 4 || @ Tigers || 3–1 || Douglass (4–1) || Hernández (0–1) || Rodney (2) || 28,148 || 46–61
|- style="text-align:center;background-color:#bbffbb"
| 108 || August 5 || @ White Sox || 4–2 || Piñeiro (4–7) || García (11–5) || Guardado (26) || 39,165 || 47–61
|- style="text-align:center;background-color:#ffbbbb"
| 109 || August 6 || @ White Sox || 4–2 || Buehrle (13–4) || Moyer (9–4) || Hermanson (27) || 37,529 || 47–62
|- style="text-align:center;background-color:#ffbbbb"
| 110 || August 7 || @ White Sox || 3–1 || Garland (16–5) || Harris (0–1) || Hermanson (28) || 35,706 || 47–63
|- style="text-align:center;background-color:#bbffbb"
| 111 || August 8 || Twins || 5–4 || Sherrill (1–0) || Silva (7–6) || Guardado (27) || 35,401 || 48–63
|- style="text-align:center;background-color:#bbffbb"
| 112 || August 9 || Twins || 1–0 || Hernández (1–1) || Lohse (7–11) || Guardado (28) || 34,213 || 49–63
|- style="text-align:center;background-color:#ffbbbb"
| 113 || August 10 || Twins || 7–3 || Nathan (5–3) || Nelson (1–2) || || 35,801 || 49–64
|- style="text-align:center;background-color:#ffbbbb"
| 114 || August 12 || Angels || 9–4 || Donnelly (7–3) || Putz (4–5) || || 37,585 || 49–65
|- style="text-align:center;background-color:#ffbbbb"
| 115 || August 13 || Angels || 9–1 || Colon (15–6) || Franklin (6–12) || || 42,500 || 49–66
|- style="text-align:center;background-color:#ffbbbb"
| 116 || August 14 || Angels || 7–6 || Donnelly (8–3) || Sherrill (1–1) || Rodríguez (27) || 38,468 || 49–67
|- style="text-align:center;background-color:#bbffbb"
| 117 || August 15 || Royals || 11–3 || Hernández (2–1) || Hernández (8–11) || || 31,908 || 50–67
|- style="text-align:center;background-color:#bbffbb"
| 118 || August 16 || Royals || 4–3 || Piñeiro (5–7) || Affeldt (0–2) || Guardado (29) || 31,425 || 51–67
|- style="text-align:center;background-color:#bbffbb"
| 119 || August 17 || Royals || 11–5 || Moyer (10–4) || Carrasco (5–7) || || 35,224 || 52–67
|- style="text-align:center;background-color:#ffbbbb"
| 120 || August 18 || @ Twins || 7–3 || Mays (6–8) || Franklin (6–13) || || 22,230 || 52–68
|- style="text-align:center;background-color:#ffbbbb"
| 121 || August 19 || @ Twins || 7–4 || Silva (8–6) || Sherrill (1–2) || Nathan (31) || 24,795 || 52–69
|- style="text-align:center;background-color:#bbffbb"
| 122 || August 20 || @ Twins || 8–3 || Sherrill (2–2) || Guerrier (0–2) || || 33,334 || 53–69
|- style="text-align:center;background-color:#ffbbbb"
| 123 || August 21 || @ Twins || 8–3 || Radke (8–10) || Piñeiro (5–8) || || 33,405 || 53–70
|- style="text-align:center;background-color:#ffbbbb"
| 124 || August 23 || @ Rangers || 6–4 || Young (11–7) || Moyer (10–5) || Cordero (28) || 25,653 || 53–71
|- style="text-align:center;background-color:#ffbbbb"
| 125 || August 24 || @ Rangers || 8–1 || Domínguez (1–3) || Franklin (6–14) || Wasdin (2) || 28,612 || 53–72
|- style="text-align:center;background-color:#bbffbb"
| 126 || August 25 || @ Rangers || 8–2 || Harris (1–1) || Benoit (3–4) || || 19,112 || 54–72
|- style="text-align:center;background-color:#ffbbbb"
| 127 || August 26 || White Sox || 5–3 || Vizcaíno (6–5) || Nelson (1–3) || Hermanson (32) || 40,431 || 54–73
|- style="text-align:center;background-color:#ffbbbb"
| 128 || August 27 || White Sox || 4–3 || Contreras (9–7) || Piñeiro (5–9) || Marte (4) || 37,326 || 54–74
|- style="text-align:center;background-color:#bbffbb"
| 129 || August 28 || White Sox || 9–2 || Moyer (11–5) || García (11–7) || || 36,838 || 55–75
|- style="text-align:center;background-color:#ffbbbb"
| 130 || August 29 || Yankees || 7–4 || Small (5–0) || Thornton (0–4) || Rivera (34) || 41,731 || 55–75
|- style="text-align:center;background-color:#bbffbb"
| 131 || August 30 || Yankees || 8–3 || Harris (2–1) || Chacón (3–2) || || 37,773 || 56–75
|- style="text-align:center;background-color:#ffbbbb"
| 132 || August 31 || Yankees || 2–0 || Johnson (13–8) || Hernández (2–2) || Rivera (35) || 46,240 || 56–76

|- style="text-align:center;background-color:#bbffbb"
| 133 || September 1 || Yankees || 5–1 || Sherrill (3–2) || Sturtze (4–3) || || 39,986 || 57–76
|- style="text-align:center;background-color:#ffbbbb"
| 134 || September 2 || @ Angels || 4–1 || Byrd (10–9) || Moyer (11–6) || Rodríguez (33) || 42,604 || 57–77
|- style="text-align:center;background-color:#bbffbb"
| 135 || September 3 || @ Angels || 6–3 || Putz (5–5) || Shields (8–10) || || 43,819 || 58–77
|- style="text-align:center;background-color:#ffbbbb"
| 136 || September 4 || @ Angels || 5–3 || Colon (18–6) || Harris (2–2) || Rodríguez (34) || 43,757 || 58–78
|- style="text-align:center;background-color:#bbffbb"
| 137 || September 5 || @ Athletics || 2–0|| Hernández (3–2) || Blanton (8–11) || Guardado (30) || 22,262 || 59–78
|- style="text-align:center;background-color:#bbffbb"
| 138 || September 6 || @ Athletics || 3–2 || Piñeiro (6–9) || Kennedy (3–2) || Guardado (31) || 24,012 || 60–78
|- style="text-align:center;background-color:#ffbbbb"
| 139 || September 7 || @ Athletics || 8–7 || Street (5–1) || Guardado (1–2) || || 14,609 || 60–79
|- style="text-align:center;background-color:#bbffbb"
| 140 || September 9 || Orioles || 3–2 || Moyer (12–6) || Bédard (6–7) || Putz (1) || 27,429 || 61–79
|- style="text-align:center;background-color:#ffbbbb"
| 141 || September 10 || Orioles || 5–3 || López (14–9) || Harris (2–3) || Ryan (30) || 30,408 || 61–80
|- style="text-align:center;background-color:#ffbbbb"
| 142 || September 11 || Orioles || 6–3 || Chen (12–9) || Hernández (3–3) || Ryan (31) || 30,212 || 61–81
|- style="text-align:center;background-color:#bbffbb"
| 143 || September 12 || Angels || 8–1 || Piñeiro (7–9) || Santana (8–8) || || 27,952 || 62–81
|- style="text-align:center;background-color:#bbffbb"
| 144 || September 13 || Angels || 2–1 || Putz (6–5) || Byrd (11–10) || || 28,813 || 63–81
|- style="text-align:center;background-color:#bbffbb"
| 145 || September 14 || Angels || 10–9 || Guardado (2–2) || Rodríguez (2–5) || || 23,397 || 64–81
|- style="text-align:center;background-color:#ffbbbb"
| 146 || September 15 || @ Rangers || 4–3 || Loe (9–5) || Harris (2–4) || Cordero (32) || 23,679 || 64–82
|- style="text-align:center;background-color:#ffbbbb"
| 147 || September 16 || @ Rangers || 5–3 || Rupe (1–0) || Hernández (3–4) || Cordero (33) || 25,567 || 64–83
|- style="text-align:center;background-color:#ffbbbb"
| 148 || September 17 || @ Rangers || 7–6 || Shouse (3–2) || Guardado (2–3) || || 41,983 || 64–84
|- style="text-align:center;background-color:#ffbbbb"
| 149 || September 18 || @ Rangers || 8–6 || Dickey (1–1) || Franklin (6–15) || Cordero (34) || 26,532 || 64–85
|- style="text-align:center;background-color:#bbffbb"
| 150 || September 19 || @ Blue Jays || 7–5 || Sherrill (4–2) || Batista (5–7) || Guardado (32) || 18,762 || 65–85
|- style="text-align:center;background-color:#ffbbbb"
| 151 || September 20 || @ Blue Jays || 6–4 || Towers (12–11) || Harris (2–5) || Frasor (1) || 19,002 || 65–86
|- style="text-align:center;background-color:#bbffbb"
| 152 || September 21 || @ Blue Jays || 3–2 || Hernández (4–4) || Bush (5–10) || Guardado (33) || 21,469 || 66–86
|- style="text-align:center;background-color:#ffbbbb"
| 153 || September 22 || @ Blue Jays || 7–5 || Speier (3–2) || Piñeiro (7–10) || Batista (29) || 23,118 || 66–87
|- style="text-align:center;background-color:#bbffbb"
| 154 || September 23 || @ Tigers || 2–1 || Franklin (7–15) || Spurling (3–4) || Guardado (34) || 23,972 || 67–87
|- style="text-align:center;background-color:#ffbbbb"
| 155 || September 24 || @ Tigers || 7–1 || Grilli (1–0) || Moyer (12–7) || || 25,328 || 67–88
|- style="text-align:center;background-color:#ffbbbb"
| 156 || September 25 || @ Tigers || 8–1 || Maroth (14–13) || Hasegawa (1–3) || || 26,128 || 67–89
|- style="text-align:center;background-color:#ffbbbb"
| 157 || September 27 || Rangers || 3–2 || Wasdin (3–2) || Mateo (3–5) || Cordero (36) || 22,739 || 67–90
|- style="text-align:center;background-color:#ffbbbb"
| 158 || September 28 || Rangers || 7–3 || Young (12–7) || Piñeiro (7–11) || Cordero (37) || 20,723 || 67–91
|- style="text-align:center;background-color:#bbffbb"
| 159 || September 29 || Rangers || 4–3 || Franklin (8–15) || Rogers (14–8) || Guardado (35) || 19,481 || 68–91
|- style="text-align:center;background-color:#bbffbb"
| 160 || September 30 || Athletics || 4–1 || Moyer (13–7) || Saarloos (10–9) || Guardado (36) || 34,809 || 69–91

|- style="text-align:center;background-color:#ffbbbb"
| 161 || October 1 || Athletics || 4–3 || Blanton (12–12) || Mateo (3–6) || Street (23) || 26,998 || 69–92
|- style="text-align:center;background-color:#ffbbbb"
| 162 || October 2 || Athletics || 8–3 || Kennedy (4–5) || Sherrill (4–3) || || 35,300 || 69–93

Player stats

Batting

Starters by position
Note: Pos = Position; G = Games played; AB = At bats; H = Hits; Avg. = Batting average; HR = Home runs; RBI = Runs batted in

Other batters
Note: G = Games played; AB = At bats; H = Hits; Avg. = Batting average; HR = Home runs; RBI = Runs batted in

Pitching

Starting and other pitchers
Note: G = Games pitched; IP = Innings pitched; W = Wins; L = Losses; ERA = Earned run average; SO = Strikeouts

Relief pitchers
Note: G = Games pitched; IP = Innings pitched; W = Wins; L = Losses; H = Holds; SV = Saves; ERA = Earned run average; SO = Strikeouts

Team statistics
Positions in brackets are in league with other MLB teams

Batting
Note: G = Games played; AB = At bats; H = Hits; R = Runs; Avg. = Batting average; HR = Home runs; RBI = Runs batted in

Pitching
Note: G = Games pitched; W = Wins; L = Losses; ERA = Earned run average; SO = Strikeouts; SHO = Shutouts

Farm system

 Major League Baseball Draft

Below is a list of 2005 Seattle Mariners draft picks. The Mariners took part in both the Rule 4 draft (June amateur draft) and the Rule 5 draft. The first selection by the Mariners in the Rule 4 draft was catcher Jeff Clement. The first and only player selected by Seattle in the Rule 5 draft was infielder Jason Bourgeois.

June amateur draft

Key

Table

Rule 5 draft

Key

Table

ReferencesGame Logs:1st Half: Seattle Mariners Game Log on ESPN.com
2nd Half: Seattle Mariners Game Log on ESPN.comBatting Statistics: Seattle Mariners Batting Stats on ESPN.comPitching Statistics:''' Seattle Mariners Pitching Stats on ESPN.com

External links

2005 Seattle Mariners at Baseball Reference
2005 Seattle Mariners team page at www.baseball-almanac.com

Seattle Mariners seasons
Seattle Mariners season
2005 in sports in Washington (state)